In the 2017–18 season, ES Sétif competed in Ligue 1 for the 48th season, as well as the Algerian Cup.

Competitions

Overview

{| class="wikitable" style="text-align: center"
|-
!rowspan=2|Competition
!colspan=8|Record
!rowspan=2|Started round
!rowspan=2|Final position / round
!rowspan=2|First match
!rowspan=2|Last match
|-
!
!
!
!
!
!
!
!
|-
| Ligue 1

| 
| 8th
| 26 August 2017
| 19 May 2018
|-
| Algerian Cup

| Round of 64
| Round of 32
| 29 December 2017
| 15 January 2018
|-
| Super Cup

| Final
| style="background:gold;"| Winners
| colspan=2| 1 November 2017
|-
| Champions League

| First round
| Group stage
| 11 February 2018
| 15 May 2018
|-
! Total

Ligue 1

League table

Results summary

Results by round

Matches

Algerian Cup

Algerian Super Cup

Champions League

Preliminary round

First round

Group stage

Group B

Squad information

Playing statistics

|-
! colspan=14 style=background:#dcdcdc; text-align:center| Goalkeepers

|-
! colspan=14 style=background:#dcdcdc; text-align:center| Defenders

|-
! colspan=14 style=background:#dcdcdc; text-align:center| Midfielders

|-
! colspan=14 style=background:#dcdcdc; text-align:center| Forwards

|-
! colspan=14 style=background:#dcdcdc; text-align:center| Players transferred out during the season

Goalscorers

Squad list
As of August 25, 2017.

Transfers

In

Out

References

2017-18
ES Sétif